State Route 10 (SR 10) is a south–north route from the Alabama state line in Lincoln County, Tennessee to the Kentucky state line in Macon County.

For most of the highway's length, it is an unsigned designation for US 231.

Route description

Alabama to Murfreesboro
SR 10 begins at the Alabama state line in Lincoln County, just north of Hazel Green, Alabama, where it is the unsigned companion route of US 231/US 431. The highway then goes north through farmland and countryside and has an intersection with SR 275 before going through Park City and crossing a ridge into Fayetteville. Once in Fayetteville, it has a Y-intersection with SR 110 before going through a major business and coming to an intersection with US 64 Bypass (US 64 Byp.). Here, US 431 continues straight into downtown while US 231/SR 10 turns east to follow US 64 Byp. to the south. It then curves to the north before coming to an intersection with US 64/SR 15/SR 50, where US 64 Byp. ends separate and US 231/SR 10 continues north through some farmland before climbing on top of Chestnut Ridge to cross into Moore County.

US 231/SR 10 then intersects and has a short concurrency with SR 129 as it straddles the county line with Lincoln County before crossing into Bedford County. The route then lowers down off Chestnut Ridge and goes through more farmland and has a crossing of the Duck River before entering Shelbyville. It first goes through some suburbs before having a Y-intersection and running concurrently with SR 64/SR 130 and entering downtown. SR 64/SR 130 then separates and turns east at an intersection with SR 82/SR 387 (Lane Parkway), and SR 82 joins the concurrency before curving to the east and then turning north again to have an intersection with US 41A/SR 16. US 231/SR 10/SR 82 then passes through the northern part of town and some suburbs before having an interchange with SR 437 (Shelbyville Bypass). It also passes by Bomar Field, Shelbyville's airport, before leaving Shelbyville. The highway then passes just east of Fosterville before SR 82 separates and goes east, while US 231/SR 10 heads north through more farmland and eventually crosses into Rutherford County.

It then crosses a ridge and passes through Christiana to an intersection and short concurrency with SR 269 before crossing another ridge and entering Murfreesboro. US 231/SR 10 first goes through a suburban area with a few businesses before having an interchange with I-24. The highway then goes north through a major business district before having a Y-intersection running concurrently with US 41/US 70S/SR 1/SR 99 and entering downtown. It then passes through downtown before coming to an intersection with SR 96, where SR 99 turns southwest to follow SR 96, US 41/US 70S/SR 1 continues north, and US 231/SR 10 turns northeast to run concurrently with SR 96. It begins passing through suburbs as SR 96 separates and turns east. US 231/SR 10 then has an intersection with SR 268 before passing by the VA hospital before leaving Murfreesboro soon after. It then passes through Waterhill and has an X-intersection with SR 266 before going through farmland again and crossing into Wilson County.

Murfreesboro to Kentucky
US 231/SR 10 then immediately has an intersection with SR 452 (Bill France Boulevard), which provides access to Nashville Superspeedway and I-840, before passing right through the middle of Cedars of Lebanon State Park. It then immediately has an intersection with SR 265 before passing through more farmland and by a rock quarry before entering Lebanon just south of the I-40 interchange. It then has an interchange with I-40 and goes through a major business district, paralleling SR 266, before entering downtown and having an intersection with US 70 BUS/SR 24. US 231/SR 10 then continues north through downtown and has an intersection with US 70/SR 26 before going through some suburbs before leaving Lebanon. It then crosses over the Cumberland River at Hunter's Point to enter Trousdale County. 

It then passes through more farmland until near the small community of Castalian Springs, where it comes to an intersection with SR 25. Here, SR 10 becomes signed for the first time as a primary highway and leaves US 231 to go east concurrently with SR 25 while US 231 continues north concurrently with its new companion route, SR 376. It goes through farmland all the way to Hartsville, where it has an intersection and short concurrency with SR 141 before passing just north of downtown. It then goes by a few subdivisions and two schools before leaving Hartsville, and SR 10 then separates from SR 25 to head north shortly afterwards. SR 10 travels alone for the first time as it goes north to cross into Macon County.

It then passes down a long narrow valley before coming to an intersection with SR 52 just south of Lafayette. SR 10 then enters Lafayette and goes through downtown before having an intersection with SR 261. It then passes through a suburb before leaving Lafayette and traveling through farmland again all the way to the Kentucky border, where SR 10 ends and continues as KY 99, which has an intersection with KY 1578 just across the state line.

Major intersections

References 

010
Transportation in Lincoln County, Tennessee
Transportation in Moore County, Tennessee
Transportation in Bedford County, Tennessee
Transportation in Rutherford County, Tennessee
Transportation in Wilson County, Tennessee
Transportation in Trousdale County, Tennessee
Transportation in Macon County, Tennessee